Helen Meles (Tigrinya: ሄለን መለስ; born 11 September 1971) is an Eritrean singer and actress. She has released several albums and appeared in many top-rated Eritrean films.

Biography

She began her musical career early, at the age of eight, when she joined the Kassala, Sudan-based Red Flowers band (ቀያሕቲ ዕምባባ). The group was formed by the Eritrean People's Liberation Front (EPLF)'s local education branch. With the band, she performed in different parts of Sudan as a lead singer.

At the age of 15 in 1988, Helen joined the EPLF, where she was enrolled in the organization's revolutionary school. She is known for her successful transition from ex-war combatant with the group to prominent singer.

Discography

Albums
 Vol. 1 - Kuhulay Segen – 1997
 Vol. 2 -  Ti Gezana – 1998 (Remix of Tebereh Tesfahuney Oldies)
 Mamina (Remix of Amleset Abay Oldies) feat. Amleset Abay
 Vol. 3 – Remix Of Kuhulay Segen – 2000
 Vol. 4. – Res'ani – 2003
 Vol. 5 – Halewat – 2006
 Vol. 6 – Baal Sham – 2013

Singles
 "Abey keydu silimatki" (1990)
 "Eza adey" (1998)
 "Warsay" (1998)
 "Shabai" /AKA/ "Aba Selie" (1999)
 "Debdabieu" (1999)
 "Mesilka we" (2000)
 "Sham" (2000)
 "Betey" (2001)
 "Gagyeka" (2002)
 "Nacfa" (2003)
 "Nibat fikri" (2003)
 "Likie" (2003)
 "Nisa tinber" (2003)
 "Kewhi lubu" (2004)
 "Manta Fikri" (2004)
 "Ertrawit ade" (2004)
 "Halime Ember" (2005)
 "Fir Fir" (2006)
 "Nihnan nisikin" (2006)
 "Abaka Ember" (2006)
 "Tsetser" (2008)
 "Menesey" (2010)
 "Rahsi" (2011)
 "Dibab" (2012)
 "Fikri Hamime" (2013)
 "Seare" (2014)
 "Tsigabey" (2016)
 "Adi Sewra" (2017)
 "Tezareb" (2017)
 "Yiakleni" (2018)
 "Meaza" (2019)

Filmography
 Fikrin Kunatn (1997)
 Debdabieu (1999)
 Mesilka'we (2000)
 Rahel (2002)
 Manta Fikri (2004)
 Tuwyo Netsela (2006)
 Menyu Tehatati (2007)

Awards
 2000: 3rd AbaSelie (Shabay) EriTv Award National Songs
 2001: 4th Sham        Raimoc Eritrean Artistic Award
 2001: 1st Sham        EriTv Award Top Ten Love Songs
 2003: 3rd Res’Ani, 4th Nib’At Fikri, 7th NisiHa Fikri Top Ten Eri-Festival Artistic Award
 2005: 1st Halime EmberTop Ten Eri-Festival Artistic Award
 2006: 2nd Fir Fir        Top Ten Eri-Festival Artistic Award
 2007: 7th Beleni’ta        Top Ten Eri-Festival Artistic Award

See also
Music of Eritrea

References

Eritrean actresses
20th-century Eritrean women singers
Living people
1966 births
21st-century Eritrean women singers